James Price William Gwynne-Holford (25 November 1833 – 6 February 1916) was a British Conservative politician.

Gwynne-Holford was elected MP for Brecon at a by-election in 1870, and held the seat until 1880.

Personal life
Gwynne-Holford was born in Llansantffraed, Brecon, son of Colonel James Price Gwynne-Holford, Buckland Hall and his wife, Anna Maria Eleanor, daughter of Roderick Gwynne, Glebran.  The father died in 1846.

He married Eleanor Gordon-Canning in 1891 at St James's Church, Hanover Square, London. They had one daughter.

He was educated at Eton College and Christ Church, Oxford. After a short military career he retired to his country estates at Cilgwyn and Buckland, and took an active part in the public life of Brecknockshire. He served as High Sheriff of the county in 1857.

Political career
In 1870, Lord Hyde, MP for Brecon, was promoted to the House of Lords.  Gwynne-Holford stood in the by-election to elect a successor, capturing the seat to the Conservatives.  He succeeded in retaining the seat in the 1874 general election but lost to the Liberal Cyril Flower at the general election of 1880.

Between 1888 and 1896 he served as a member of Breconshire County Council.

Gwynne-Holford died in 1916.

References

External links
 

UK MPs 1868–1874
UK MPs 1874–1880
1833 births
1916 deaths
Conservative Party (UK) MPs for Welsh constituencies
People educated at Eton College
Alumni of Christ Church, Oxford